Christopher Adriaan Dry (born 13 February 1988) is a South African professional rugby union player, currently playing with the South African Sevens team in the Sevens World Series. His regular position is a flanker.

Youth rugby

Dry played rugby for his school, Grey College in Bloemfontein, earning a call-up to Free State's Under-18 side that played at the Academy Week tournament in 2006.

Professional

Dry made his first class debut for the  during the 2009 Currie Cup Premier Division, coming on as a late substitute in their 59–8 victory against  in Bloemfontein.

Dry made a single appearance for university side  during the 2010 Varsity Cup competition, a 37–31 win over  before joining the Free State Cheetahs' squad for the 2010 Vodacom Cup.

South Africa Sevens

In 2010, Dry joined the South African Sevens setup. He made his debut at the 2010 Adelaide Sevens tournament and participated in four tournaments in the 2009–10 IRB Sevens World Series and quickly established himself as a regular in the side.

Dry made six tournament appearances in the 2010–11 IRB Sevens World Series and played in all nine events of the 2011–12 IRB Sevens World Series. He played in the first eight events during the 2012–13 IRB Sevens World Series but missed out on the 2013 London Sevens. He was also a member of the Blitzbokke that played at the 2013 Rugby World Cup Sevens, but disappointingly got knocked out at the quarter-final stage by Fiji.

Dry once again played in all nine events of the 2013–14 IRB Sevens World Series before participating at the 2014 Commonwealth Games in Glasgow, helping his side all the way to the final, where they got a 17–12 victory over a New Zealand that won the previous four tournaments.

References

External links 
 

South African rugby union players
Living people
1988 births
Sportspeople from Cape Town
Rugby union flankers
Free State Cheetahs players
South Africa international rugby sevens players
Rugby sevens players at the 2014 Commonwealth Games
Commonwealth Games gold medallists for South Africa
Commonwealth Games rugby sevens players of South Africa
Commonwealth Games medallists in rugby sevens
Rugby sevens players at the 2020 Summer Olympics
Olympic rugby sevens players of South Africa
Medallists at the 2014 Commonwealth Games